Rich Thompson is the name of:
Rich Thompson (pitcher, born 1984), Major League Baseball relief pitcher
Rich Thompson (outfielder) (born 1979), professional baseball outfielder
Rich Thompson (pitcher, born 1958), former Major League Baseball relief pitcher
Rich Thompson (drummer), drummer with the Count Basie Orchestra

See also
Richard Thompson (disambiguation)